Francisco Fedullo, also spelt as Francesco, (27 May 1905 – 30 November 1952) was a footballer who played international football for both Uruguay and Italy. He played as a midfielder or as a defender for Sud América and Bologna.

He scored a hat-trick for Italy in the silver winning 1931-32 Central European International Cup campaign against Switzerland.

Fedullo was the first Uruguayan footballer of Italian origin to play in Italy.

Honours 
Italy
 Central European International Cup: Runner-up: 1931–32

References

1905 births
1952 deaths
Uruguayan footballers
Uruguay international footballers
Italian footballers
Italy international footballers
Dual internationalists (football)
Sud América players
Bologna F.C. 1909 players
Serie A players
Association football midfielders
People of Campanian descent